Mangelia muiri is a species of sea snail, a marine gastropod mollusk in the family Mangeliidae.

Description
The shell grows to a length of 2.75 mm, its diameter 1.5 mm.

Distribution
This marine species is found off Still Bay, South Africa

References

External links
  Tucker, J.K. 2004 Catalog of recent and fossil turrids (Mollusca: Gastropoda). Zootaxa 682:1–1295.

Endemic fauna of South Africa
muiri
Gastropods described in 1958